Irvine Valley  is one of the nine electoral wards of East Ayrshire Council. Created in 2007, the ward elects three councillors using the single transferable vote electoral system. Originally a four-member ward, Irvine Valley was reduced in size following a boundary review and has elected three councillors since the 2017 East Ayrshire Council election.

As a four-member ward, the area favoured the Scottish National Party (SNP) but since the boundary changes in 2017, the ward has been split between the SNP, Labour and The Rubbish Party.

Boundaries
The ward was created following the Fourth Statutory Reviews of Electoral Arrangements ahead of the 2007 Scottish local elections. As a result of the Local Governance (Scotland) Act 2004, local elections in Scotland would use the single transferable vote electoral system from 2007 onwards so Irvine Valley was formed from an amalgamation of several previous first-past-the-post wards. It contained part of the former Stewarton East and Dunlop, Kilmaurs and Stewarton South, North Kilmarnock, Fenwick and Waterside, Crookedholm, Moscow, Galston West and Hurlford North, Galston East, Mauchline and Hurlford wards as well as all of the former Darvel and Newmilns wards and initially elected four members. Irvine Valley lies in the northeast of the council area and took in the towns of Newmilns, Darvel, Galston, Fenwick, Moscow and Waterside. The original ward boundaries stretched from the council area's boundary with South Ayrshire in the west to its boundaries with East Renfrewshire and South Lanarkshire in the east. Following the Fifth Statutory Reviews of Electoral Arrangements ahead of the 2017 Scottish local elections, the ward was reduced in size to elect three members. The towns of Fenwick, Moscow and Waterside to the east of the A77 became part of the Annick ward while the area surrounding the A76 up to the council's boundary with South Ayrshire became part of the Ballochmyle ward.

Councillors

Election results

2022 election

2017 election

2015 by-election

2012 election

2007 election

Notes

References

Wards of East Ayrshire
Galston, East Ayrshire
Darvel